Brush Creek is a stream in Cooper County in the U.S. state of Missouri. It is a tributary of the Lamine River.

Brush Creek most likely was descriptively named for the brush along its course.

See also
List of rivers of Missouri

References

Rivers of Cooper County, Missouri
Rivers of Missouri